Ferenc Szűts (December 16, 1891 – November 28, 1966) was a Hungarian gymnast who competed in the 1908 Summer Olympics and in the 1912 Summer Olympics.

In 1908 he participated in the individual all-around competition, but his place is unknown. He was part of the Hungarian team, which won the silver medal in the gymnastics men's team, European system event in 1912.

References

1891 births
1966 deaths
Gymnasts from Budapest
Hungarian male artistic gymnasts
Gymnasts at the 1908 Summer Olympics
Gymnasts at the 1906 Intercalated Games
Gymnasts at the 1912 Summer Olympics
Olympic gymnasts of Hungary
Olympic silver medalists for Hungary
Olympic medalists in gymnastics
Medalists at the 1912 Summer Olympics